VRM or vrm may refer to:

Science and technology
 Virtual Resource Manager, a microkernel for the IBM RT PC workstations
 Viscous remanent magnetization, a kind of magnetization of ferromagnets
 Voltage regulator module, a buck converter (electronics)
 Variable Range Marker, a feature of radar screens

Other uses
 Vrm (župa), a historical region of Trebinje, Bosnia
 Vendor relationship management, a category of business activity
 Vehicle registration mark, the number on a vehicle registration plate